= Abuja International Photo Festival =

Annual event in Abuja, Nigeria

- Genre: Photography
- Frequency: Annually
- Location: Abuja
- Country: Nigeria
- Inaugurated: 2017
- Founder: Osaze Efe

The Abuja International Photo Festival (AIPF), also called Abuja Photo Festival, is a multi-day annual photography and visual storytelling event in Abuja, Nigeria.

== Origin ==
The Abuja International Photo Festival was founded by Nigerian photographer and curator Osaze Efe in 2017. Efe established the festival after finding few opportunities in Abuja for emerging photographers to receive mentorship, exhibit their work and build professional networks. The inaugural edition was organized through calls for submissions and brought together photographers to showcase their work and participate in photography-related activities.

== Activities ==
The Abuja International Photo Festival organises exhibitions, photography workshops, masterclasses, panel discussions, portfolio reviews, photo walks and mentorship programmes. Its activities have included both physical and virtual events, with programmes involving emerging and established photographers, visual artists, students and practitioners from related fields.

The festival's exhibitions have included open calls for photographers to submit bodies of work addressing particular themes. For example, the 2021 edition featured thematic exhibitions addressing migration, gender-based violence, human rights, disability and the COVID-19 pandemic. Photo walks have also been organised in communities in and around Abuja, with participants documenting everyday life and submitting photographs for review and exhibition.

Educational activities include practical masterclasses covering technical and professional aspects of photography, including composition, lighting, colour grading, photo editing, portfolio development and photography business practices. The festival also organises portfolio reviews and artist talks, through which emerging photographers can receive feedback on their work and interact with established practitioners.

The festival has developed programmes aimed at young people and women photographers. Framing Next involves collaboration with secondary schools and introduces students to photography and visual storytelling, while Sisters Art provides a mentorship and discussion space for young and aspiring female photographers.

Another programme, Creative Connect, brings together artists, civil society organisations, development organisations and government representatives for discussions about photography and its role in society. The festival has also organised conceptual photography competitions and exhibitions, including the Narratives of Now competition associated with the 2025 edition.

== Editions ==
=== 2017 ===
The inaugural Abuja International Photo Festival was held from 12 to 16 September 2017 in Abuja. The program included a photography exhibition, photo walks, panel sessions and masterclasses. Speakers included Nigerian photographers Don Barber and Ikechi Ugwoeje, among others. Contemporary coverage of the festival described it as a platform for photographers from Nigeria and beyond.

=== 2018 ===
The second edition was held from 15 to 19 October 2018 at the Exhibition Pavilion in Garki, Abuja. The programme included photography masterclasses, town-hall sessions, exhibitions, music and dance. Masterclasses covered documentary, wedding, fashion and travel photography, as well as photography business and post-production.

=== 2019 ===
The third edition was held in 2019. According to a retrospective published by NewsWireNGR, the festival's activities in 2019 led to the establishment of the Art for Humanity Foundation, which subsequently expanded the festival's photography training, mentorship and community programmes.

=== 2020 ===
The fourth edition was held in 2020. The festival's official website lists 2020 among its past editions.

=== 2021 ===
The fifth edition, titled "Boundaries of Reason", was held from 26 to 30 October 2021 in Abuja, with some activities also taking place virtually. The program included masterclasses, exhibitions, seminars, portfolio reviews and photo walks. Photographers including George Osodi, Uche James-Iroha, TY Bello, Andrew Esiebo and Aisha Augie-Kuta were among the practitioners associated with the edition.

=== 2022 ===
The sixth edition was held in 2022. The festival continued its program of exhibitions, photography training, mentorship and community engagement. In connection with the festival, Art for Humanity Foundation also provided photography training to teenage girls living in an internally displaced persons' camp in Abuja.

=== 2023 ===
The seventh edition was held in 2023. The programme included exhibitions, photography workshops and mentoring sessions, with discussions focusing on the role of photography and visual storytelling in documenting Nigeria's social, cultural, economic and political realities.

=== 2024 ===
The eighth edition, titled "Rhythms of Resilience", was held in 2024. The edition featured exhibitions and other activities centred on photography, visual storytelling and resilience. The festival's official archive identifies it as the eighth edition.

=== 2025 ===
The ninth edition, titled "A World Connected", was held from 29 to 31 October 2025 at the Exhibition Pavilion in Abuja. The exhibition invited photographers to explore connections between people, cultures, environments, technology and communities.
